The FIS Nordic World Ski Championships 1941 took place February 1–10, 1941 in Cortina d'Ampezzo, Italy. The previous championships of 1940 were scheduled for Norway, but were cancelled in the wake of Germany's invasion of Norway during World War II. At the 1946 meeting in Pau, France, the FIS declared this a non-event because of the limited number of competitors. Medals were awarded in this event, but not counted in the overall FIS Nordic World Ski Championships as a result.

Men's cross country

18 km

50 km

4 × 10 km relay

Men's Nordic combined

Individual 

Berauer was from Czechoslovakia while Gstrein was from Austria, but both competed for Germany after the Nazis occupied their respective countries in 1938.

Men's ski jumping

Individual large hill

Military patrol competition

A military patrol competition, 25 km cross-country skiing and rifle shooting, was also held outside of the official FIS Nordic World Ski Championships.

Medal table

References
FIS history of the 1941 Championships
German Wikipedia information on this event
Hickoksports list of medal winners including 1941

FIS Nordic World Ski Championships
1941 in Nordic combined
Sport in Cortina d'Ampezzo
Cross-country skiing competitions in Italy
1941 in Italian sport
February 1941 sports events
Nordic skiing competitions in Italy